T. J. Weist (pronounced WEEST, born June 25, 1965) is an American football coach who is an assistant special teams coach for the Baltimore Ravens of the National Football League (NFL). He was the senior offensive analyst for University of Michigan in 2015 and interim head coach of the Connecticut Huskies football team for the 2013 season.

Weist, has mentored over 23 future National Football League (NFL) receivers, was also the Bearcats recruiting coordinator for 2012. He also has been on staffs at Tulsa (1996), Southern Illinois (1994–95), Michigan (1990–93) and Alabama (1988–89). The Wolverines reached four postseason bowl games during his tenure, including two Rose Bowl appearances, while the Crimson Tide appeared in a pair of postseason contests while he was on the coaching staff including the 1990 Sugar Bowl. [2]

Early life
A native of Bay City, Michigan, Weist enrolled at Alabama, where he was a letterman, as a wide receiver under head coaches Ray Perkins and Bill Curry. In 1988, he received a B.S in health and physical education, then finished his education a year later, receiving a M.S. in exercise physiology.

Coaching career

Indiana
Weist got started at Indiana where he coached special teams, and also served as the Hoosiers' recruiting coordinator his first two years.

Western Kentucky
Weist was hired at Western Kentucky serving serving under head coach Jack Harbaugh. During his time at WKU he coached the wide receivers and also served as the team's assistant head coach (2007–09) and offensive coordinator (2003–06). As offensive coordinator in 2006, WKU ranked 23rd in the country in total offense, also finishing 17th in pass efficiency rating while posting more than 4,000 total yards for the fifth consecutive season. Weist helped direct an offense that averaged 405.73 yards per game in 2005, while scoring more than 30 points a game. The Hilltoppers ranked in the top 30 nationally in four different categories.

Cincinnati
In 2010 Weist joined Butch Jones staff at Cincinnati as wide receivers coach. Weist coached a pair of All-Big East Conference selections in Armon Binns (first team) and D. J. Woods (second team) as the duo were the No. 1 and 2 ranked receivers in the Big East in 2010.  The Bearcats were the only NCAA FBS school to have two wide receivers with 15 or more 20-yard receptions in 2010.  In 2010, the Bearcats led the Big East in scoring offense (27.1 ppg), total offense (417.3 ypg) and passing offense (260.7 ypg).

In 2011, Cincinnati averaged 385 yards of total offense per game and scored an average of 33.3 points per game on the way to a Big East conference championship and a win in the Liberty Bowl over Vanderbilt.

Weist helped lead the Bearcats to a 10–3 record in 2012 and a 48-34 victory over Duke in the Belk Bowl.  Weist served as Cincinnati's offensive coordinator in the Belk Bowl as the Bearcats gained 554 yards of total offense on 53 plays and did not have a turnover.  Cincinnati was 17 of 25 in passing for 332 yards.  Cincinnati was ranked second in the Big East in total offense at 440.23 yards per game and was first in the Big East in scoring offense at 32.31 points per game. During his time with the Bearcats, Cincinnati won a total of two Big East championships.

Connecticut
Weist was hired as offensive coordinator and wide receivers coach at UConn before the 2013 season. On September 30, 2013, two days after losing to Buffalo 41–12, Weist was named interim head coach, replacing Paul Pasqualoni who had been fired earlier in the day. His first game as head coach was a 13-10 loss to South Florida. Weist was able to salvage the huskies 2013 season by leading the team to wins over Temple, Rutgers, and Memphis.

Michigan
Michigan head coach Jim Harbaugh hired Weist in 2015 to be Michigan's senior offensive analyst.

South Florida
On January 26, 2016 South Florida head coach Willie Taggart name Weist co–offensive coordinator and wide receivers coach.
At the end of the 2016 season Taggart left South Florida to take the head coaching job at Oregon and Weist was named interim head coach for the 2016 Birmingham Bowl. South Florida knocked off South Carolina 46-39 in overtime.

Baltimore Ravens
In 2018 Baltimore Ravens head coach John Harbaugh, hired Weist as an offensive analyst.

Personal life
Weist has a wife Karen. Together, they have a son James, and daughters Samantha and Kerrington.

Head coaching record

References

External links
 Baltimore Ravens profile

1965 births
Living people
American football wide receivers
Alabama Crimson Tide football coaches
Alabama Crimson Tide football players
Baltimore Ravens coaches
Cincinnati Bearcats football coaches
UConn Huskies football coaches
Indiana Hoosiers football coaches
Michigan Wolverines football coaches
South Florida Bulls football coaches
Southern Illinois Salukis football coaches
Tulsa Golden Hurricane football coaches
Western Kentucky Hilltoppers football coaches
Sportspeople from Bay City, Michigan